Mayo Simon is an American screenwriter, author and playwright.

He is the father of the author Francesca Simon and biologist-X-Files science advisor Anne Simon.

Select filmography
Man from Atlantis (1977) (pilot episode)
Futureworld (1976) 
Phase IV (1974) (original screenplay)
Marooned (1969) (screenplay)
Why Man Creates (1968) (conceived and written with Saul Bass)
I Could Go On Singing (1963) (screenplay)

Select plays
Happiness - Lincoln Center
L.A. Under Siege (1970) - Mark Taper Forrum
Elaine's Daughter - Actors Theatre of Louisville
The Twilight Romance (2003) - Falcon Theatre
Greek Holiday (2003) - Payright's theatre
The Old lady's Guide to Survival - Actors Theatre of Louisville
These Men (1980) - Bush theatre
Walking to Waldheim - Lincoln Center
A Rich Full Life (1985) - L.A. Theatre Center
Going West (2010) - Shooting Star Theatre

Books
The Audience & the Playwright (2003)

References

External links

Living people
American dramatists and playwrights
American male screenwriters
Place of birth missing (living people)
Year of birth missing (living people)
American television writers
American male television writers
American male dramatists and playwrights